USS Barracuda may refer to more than one United States Navy ship:

USS Barracuda was the original name of a submarine renamed  in 1911 while under construction
Barracuda (SP-23), a proposed patrol boat inspected for possible service in late 1916 or early 1917 which never entered U.S. Navy service
, a patrol boat in commission from 1917 to 1919
, originally named USS V-1 when she was launched in 1924, a submarine in commission from 1924 to 1937 and from 1940 to 1945
, later SST-3, originally named USS K-1 when she was launched in 1951, a submarine in commission from 1951 to 1959.

See also 
 A fictitious Cold War U.S. Navy submarine named USS Barracuda (SSN-593) appears in the 1986 novel To Kill the Potemkin by Mark Joseph

United States Navy ship names